Bolton Wanderers F.C. is an English association football club based in Horwich, Greater Manchester. The club was formed in Bolton in 1874 as Christ Church F.C., and played their first competitive match in October 1881, when they entered the First Round of the 1881–82 FA Cup. The club was renamed Bolton Wanderers F.C. in 1877, and they moved to Burnden Park in 1895 and the Reebok Stadium in 1997. The club won its first significant trophy in 1923 by beating West Ham United in the first FA Cup Final to be played at Wembley Stadium. Over the next forty years the club won a further 3 FA Cups. The club has gained promotion to the Premier League one three separate occasions; first in 1995, then again in 1997, with each term lasting for only one season on each occasion, before again gaining promotion in 2001. 

Since playing their first competitive match, more than 850 players have made a competitive first-team appearance for the club, many of whom have played between 25 and 99 matches (including substitute appearances).

Five players have fallen one short of 100 appearances for Bolton Wanderers, John Slater and Evan Jones, whose appearances were reduced due to the first World War, Harry McShane and Jack Bradley, who both played for the club between 1947 and 1951, and Dorian Dervite who played between 2014 and 2018. John Owen, who appeared between 1906 and 1911 played 98 times for the club. Welsh midfielder MJ Williams is the player still at the club closest to 100 appearances, having played 92 matches for Bolton Wanderers.

As of March 2023, a total of 297 players have played between 25 and 99 competitive matches for the club. Of those players, eighteen are still playing for the club and can add to their total.

List of players

 Appearances and goals are for first-team competitive matches only, including Premier League, Football League, FA Cup, League Cup, Charity Shield and UEFA Cup; wartime matches are regarded as unofficial and are excluded, as are matches from the abandoned 1939–40 season.
 Players are listed according to the date of their first team debut for the club.

Statistics correct as of match played 17 March 2023

Table headers
 Nationality – If a player played international football, the country or countries he played for are shown. Otherwise, the player's nationality is given as his country of birth.
 Bolton Wanderers career – The year of the player's first appearance for Bolton Wanderers to the year of his last appearance.
 Starts – The number of games started.
 Sub – The number of games played as a substitute.
 Total – The total number of games played, both as a starter and as a substitute.

Notes
  A utility player is one who is considered to play in more than one position.

References

 
Players (25-99 appearances)
Bolton Wanderers
Association football player non-biographical articles